Note there is no single fixed definition of a scooter (also known by the full name motor-scooter), but generally a smaller motorcycle with a step-through frame is considered a scooter, especially if it has a floor for the rider's feet (as opposed to straddling the vehicle like a conventional motorcycle). Other common traits of scooters can include: bodywork (so the mechanicals are not exposed like a conventional motorcycle), motors combined with the suspension or wheel (rather than attached to the frame like a conventional motorcycle), leg shields, smaller wheels than a conventional motorcycle, and an alternative to a chain drive.

Scooters share traits with mopeds (some models could even be considered both a moped and a scooter). Adding to the confusion between them, in many jurisdictions smaller engined scooters (e.g. 50cc) are road registered in the same legal category as mopeds (often named "Moped" class), leading to scooters being casually referred to as "mopeds" in such areas. Underbones also share traits with scooters (e.g. small and step-through design), but they are generally not strictly considered scooters in the purest sense as they do not have a floor, but they are often casually referred to as scooters (especially ones with leg shields).

Scooter brands in production

Scooter brands and manufacturers no longer in scooter production
Accumolli (1950), Piaggio powered  — Italy
Achilles (1953—1957) — West Germany
ACMA (Vespa) (1951—1962), Ateliers de Construction de Motocycles et Accessoires — France
Adonis (1949—1952), Société du Scooters Adonis; 50 and 75cc VAP engines — France
Aermacchi (1951—1969) — Italy
Aermoto (1938—1940), Sachs powered  — Italy
Agrati (1958—1965), Merged with Garelli in 1961, scooters branded as Garelli Capri from 1965 — Italy
Allstate/Sears (1948—1967), Brand of retailer Sears to rebadge scooters manufactured by Cushman, Piaggio and Puch. The Allstate name was replaced with "Sears" for 1966-1967 — USA
American Motor Scooter Corporation (1960—1965), Clinton powered folding "suitcase" scooters; Founded by USA Lambretta parts dealer, taken over by American Lincoln Corporation — USA
 Allwyn (1974—?), the Pushpak model was a Lambretta GP based scooter manufactured by Andhra Pradesh Scooters Limited, who later also made licensed Vespa PL170s (1983-1986) — India
Arctic Cat (2000s) — USA
Ardent (1949—1954), Manufacture Française des Scooters Ardents; initially motorcycle scooter hybrids; Le Poulain and VAP engines — France
Auteco Lambretta / Auteco (1954—1970s), small scale assembly of Lambrettas badged as "Auteco Lambretta"; (1990s), Bajaj importers — Colombia 
Autoglider (1919—1922) — United Kingdom
Autoped (1915–1921) — USA
(API) Lambretta / API (1955—1990), models called Lamby Polos after SIL obtained use of the Lambretta name in the 1970s — India 
Bernardet (1948—1959) — France
Bianchi (1960s) Orsetto, also made under licence in the UK by Raleigh as the Roma (1961-64)  — Italy
BSA (1958—1965) — United Kingdom
Bitri (1955—1964) — Netherlands
Bond (1957—1962), Makers of Bond Minicars; Villiers powered — United Kingdom
Bonvinci Marino (BM) (1959—1964), Models included Minotauro (75cc) and Pokerino (50cc) — Italy
Brockhouse Corgi (1946—1954), Civilian version of the military Welbike. Built by Brockhouse Engineering Ltd., and sold as brands including Indian Papoose in the USA — United Kingdom
Brumana Pugliese (1970—1980), Lambretta models plus its own models — Brazil
Busi (1940—1951)  — Italy
Cagiva — Italy
Cazenave (1954—1960), Mistral and Ydral engines — France
Centaur (1960—1965), Clinton powered folding "suitcase scooter" made by Alexander Reynolds Co. Folding Scooters — USA
Čezeta (CZ), (1957—1964) —  Czechoslovak Socialist Republic
Concord (1950s), See Manurhin below — France
Cushman (1936—1965) — USA
Cycle-Scoot (1950s) — USA
Danmotor Vespa Indonesia (1970s), Licensed Vespa 90cc and 150cc models — Indonesia
DKR (1957—1967), DKR Company formed by Day & Robinson of Willenhall Radiators, and Cyril Kieft, Villiers engined. — United Kingdom
DKW (1921—1922, 1954–1957) — Germany / West Germany
DMW (1957—1967) — United Kingdom
Doodle Bug (1946—1948), built by the Beam Manufacturing Company, and sold by retailer Gambles store chain under the Hiawatha name — USA
Douglas (Vespa) (1951—1965), licence built Vespas — United Kingdom
Ducati — Italy
Durkopp (1954—1960) — West Germany
FAKA (1952—1957), Took over production of Walba scooters — West Germany
(Fenwick) Lambretta (1951—1960) — France
FIAMC (Fabbrica Italiana Auto Moto Cicli) (1950s) — Italy
Fly / Flyscooters (2006—2010), Florida based distributors of Chinese and Taiwanese built scooters, particularly Znen  — USA 
Frambretta (1970s—?), Truck versions of Siambretta's licence built Lambrettas — Argentina 
Fuji (1946—1968), In addition to the Rabbit marque of Fuji Heavy Industries (parent company of Subaru), Fuji also made the Go-Devil folding "suitcase scooter" from 1964 to 1967 — Japan
Garelli (1965—1970), post-merger re-branding of the Agrati Capri — Italy
Generic (2000s), Former brand of Austrian KSR Group used for Asian imports — Austria
Glas Gogo (1950—1967) — West Germany
Gitan (1960s), produced by Moto Gitane, models included the 50cc Joligri — Italy
Guizzo (1955—1964), built by Palmieri & Gulinelli of Bologna — Italy
Harley-Davidson — USA
Heinkel (1953—1965) — West Germany
Hercules (1950s—1970s), Absorbed into Sachs in 1963. Models included the E1 electric scooter in the 1970s — West Germany 
Hoffman (Vespa) (1950—1955), licence built Vespas — West Germany
Indian — USA
Iso (1948—1957) — Italy
IWL (1955—1965) — East Germany
James (1960—1962?), 150cc two-stroke — United Kingdom
Jawa (1950s—1960s & 1990s), '60s models include the Manet and Tatran — Czechoslovak Socialist Republic / Czech Republic
Jonghi (1953—1957) — France
Kieft (1955—1957), Importer and distributor of the German Hercules Company mopeds and scooters; Succeeded by the DKR Company — United Kingdom
Kilworth (1920s), designed by Alvis car engineer Captain Smith-Clarke; the forerunner to modern CVT automatic scooters — United Kingdom
Kinetic (1998—2008) — India
Kinetic Honda (1984—1998) — India
 Kosty/Kauba (1952 (Kosty), 1953—1956 (Kauba)), Rotax 2 stroke engines, models included the Lux 98 and Lux 125 — Austria
Kreidler — Germany
Krupp (1919–1922), licence built Autoped — Germany
KTM — Austria
Lacombe (1948—1954), P.P. Roussey two-stroke engines; also known as the Comindus.  — France
Lambretta (Innocenti parent factory) (1947—1972) — Italy
Lambretta do Brasil (formerly Pasco Lambretta) (1955—1964) — Brazil
Lamby (1977—1990), brand of API — India 
Laverda (1960—1962), models included Mini 60 and Mini-Scooter. (2000—2004), re-branded Asian sourced scooters — Italy 
 LML (formerly Lohia Machines Ltd) (1984—2017), Licensed partner of Piaggio until 1999 building Vespa based scooters, including the Select and Star models. Bankrupt 2017, factory dismantled and plant sold off (but as of 2021 planning to return as LML Electric with electric scooters) — India
Lohner (1950—1963), Rotax-Sachs and ILO engines; Merged with the Rotax engine company to form Lohner-Rotax in 1959 — Austria
MAC (1972—1977), brand of API — India 
Maico (1955—1966), models included the Maicoletta — West Germany 
Manet (1960s), models included the S100 and Tatran 125. Taken over by Jawa, production ended 1967 — Czechoslovak Socialist Republic 
Manurhin (1952—1962), Initially a licensed DKW Hobby scooter; sold in the UK as Concord brand — France
Mercury (1956—1958) (not to be confused with USA Mercury), Models included 50cc Hermes — United Kingdom
Messerschmitt (Vespa) (1955—1964), licence built Vespas — West Germany
Meteora (1950s), NSU powered — Italy
M.I.S.A. (Vespa) (1954—1962) Motor Industry Société Anonyme assembled 125 & 150 Vespa models, sold as Vespa — Belgium 
Mitsubishi (1946—1963) — Japan
Molot (1999—?), See Vyatka below — Russia
Monark (1957—1969) — Sweden
Motobi (1963—1968), 50 and 100cc scooters; Relaunched by Austrian partnership in 2010 including a scooter line — Italy 
Motoflash (1950s), 50cc and 75cc two-stroke engines — Italy
Motobloc / Riva Sport Industries (RSI) (1950s), Initially sold the Swiss AMI scooter as the Ami Motobloc. The Sulky was developed with RSI — France
Moto Guzzi (1950—1966) — Italy
Motus (20??—2017), Christchurch based NZ brand that sold Taizhou Zhongneng Motorcycle Co. Ltd. scooters manufactured in China — New Zealand
Motovespa (1953—2000), licensed Vespas, taken over by Piaggio — Spain
Moto-Zeta (2000s), Italian company selling imported Chinese scooters of 50-250cc in Europe — Italy
MV Agusta (1950s) — Italy
Nibbio (1947—1952), Initially manufactured by Gianca, transferring to San Christopher in 1949 — Italy
NSU (1951—1957), licensed Lambretta 125cc LC; from 1956 their own "Prima" range based on modified Lambretta designs — Germany
N-Zeta (1960s) — New Zealand
Paloma (1954—1969), Etablissements Michel Humblot; Acquired by Cazenave in 1964 — France
Parilla (1952—1959) Levriere 125cc and 150cc models — Italy
(Pasco) Lambretta (1964—1982), Originally Lambretta do Brasil, became Brumana Pugliese S.A. making its own small motorcycle models and a modified Lambretta Series III — Brazil 
Peirspeed, Re-badged TGB — USA
Piatti (1954—1957) — Belgium / United Kingdom
Powell Manufacturing Company (1940s) — USA 
Prina (1949—1954) — Italy
Prior (1950s), Rebadged German Hercules scooters by Industria Ltd of London for the UK and Commonwealth markets, models included the Viscount — United Kingdom/West Germany
Puch — Austria
Rabbit, (1946—1968), Brand of Fuji Heavy Industries. The first model, S-1, entered production 6 months before the Vespa — Japan
Ravat — France
Renault (2000s), Car manufacturer Renault sold an Italian made roofed scooter (which was a joint venture between Benelli and Adiva SRL), as the Renault Full Time — France
Reynolds Runabout (1919—1924), Jackson Car Manufacturing Co and later by A. W. Wall — United Kingdom
Riverside (1960s), Brand of retailer Montgomery Ward manufactured by various imported makes, including the Japanese Mitsubishi Silver Pigeon — USA
Rock-Ola (1938—1940) — USA
Royal Enfield India (1962—1970s) Fantabulous model, 175cc 2-stroke Villiers powered — India
Rumi (1954—1969) Formichino model — Italy
Salsbury (1936—1950), Californian businessman E. Foster Salsbury introduced the CVT. Models included the Motor Glide (the world's first commercially viable motor scooter).  — USA 
Schwinn — USA
Scootavia (1951—1956) — France
Scoto (1949—1950), Moped/scooter hybrid built by MGT (Million-Guiet-Tubauto) — France
Scotta (1952—1953), 125cc Motorcycle/scooter hybrid — France
Serveta / Lambretta SAL (1954—1989), License built Lambrettas, named "Lambretta SAL" after 1982 — Spain 
Siam-bretta / Siambretta (1948—1970), Licence built Lambrettas — Argentina 
Siamoto (1996—1999), Models included the Scross off-road scooter — Italy 
SICRAF (Paul Vallée Motos) (1949—1954), Societe Industrielle de Construction et de Recherches Automobiles de France; Aubier-Dunne and Ydral engines — France 
SIM (Società Italiana Motoscooters) / SIM-Moretti (1953—1955) — Italy 
Simard (1951—1954), Ydral and AMC engines — France
Simonetta / San Cristoforo (1952—1954), Later version of the Nibbio built by San Cristoforo under licence from Ravat of France — Italy
Simson (1955—2002) — East Germany / Germany
Solex (1968—1974), Micron moped with a scooter form-factor — France
Stewart (1959—1963), acquired by BSA — New Zealand
Strolch/Progress (1950—1960), Models included Rascal, Vagabond, Little Monkey. Name was changed to Progress in 1954 — West Germany
Sun / Raleigh (1957—1964), Sun Cycle & Fittings Co Ltd was absorbed by Raleigh Industries in 1958. Models included the Roma, a licence built Bianchi  — United Kingdom
Swallow (1946—1951) — United Kingdom
Tamoto (1949—1951) Motorcycle/scooter hybrids — France
Tempo (1957—1959), Sachs powered; produced at Progress-Werke-Oberkirch AG in Germany — Norway
Terrot (1952—1957) — France
Tomos / Tomos Puch (1950s—?), Moped manufacturer with scooter-like models and a license built Puch scooter. Bankrupt 2019 — Slovenia (former Yugoslavia)
TN'G  — USA
Toscane (1947) — Italy
Triumph (1959—1970), models included the Tina and Tigress — United Kingdom
TWN (Triumph-Werk Nurnberg AG) (1955) — Germany
"Tula" / TMZ (1955—1989) Initially based on the German Goggo TA200, Tula also made three-wheeled scooters — USSR (Russia)
Valmobile (1955—1961), Victor Bouffort folding "suitcase scooter" design manufactured by Martin-Moulet in France (1955–56), and Hirano Motorcycle Company of Japan (1956–61) — France & Japan
Velocette (1960—1964) — United Kingdom
Vento — USA
Venus (1953—1955) — Germany
Victa (1960s), Fuji Rabbit scooters assembled and sold by Australasian outdoor garden equipment manufacturer Victa in New Zealand — New Zealand
Vijai (1975—1997), Lambretta GP/DL made by state-owned Scooters India Ltd (SIL), with plant acquired from the defunct Lambretta. Sold as the Vijai brand in India and as Lambretta for export markets. After 1997 it focused on three-wheelers until its closure in 2021 — India
Vivani (1952) — Italy
Vyatka (1956—1979; 1999—?) Initially an unlicensed copy of the Vespa 150; In 1999 Vyatskiye Polyany Machine-Building Plant was renamed Molot and started production of the Strizh scooter, but by 2017 was struggling financially — USSR (Russia) / Russia
Walba (1949—1952), One of the first post-war German scooters, production taken over by FAKA — West Germany
WFM (Warszawska Fabryka Motocykli) (1959—1965) Manufacturers of the Osa scooter, the Polish People's Republic's only native scooter — Poland
Yulon (1964—?) Car-maker Yulon Motor Co. Ltd. license built Lambretta models — Taiwan
Zeta (1948—1954) — Italy
ZID (2000s) Degtyaryov Plant motorcycle manufacturer sold Lifan based scooters until at least 2018 — Russia 
Zündapp (1953—1964), models included the Bella and RS50  — West Germany

See also
List of motorcycle manufacturers

References

 
 
Scooter manufacturers